The 2021 Open 13 Provence was a men's tennis tournament played on indoor hard courts. It is the 29th edition of the Open 13, and part of the ATP Tour 250 series of the 2021 ATP Tour. It was the 29th edition of the tournament and took place at the Palais des Sports in Marseille, France, from 8 March until 14 March 2021. First-seeded Daniil Medvedev won the singles title.

Finals

Singles 

  Daniil Medvedev defeated  Pierre-Hugues Herbert, 6–4, 6–7(4–7), 6–4

Doubles 

  Lloyd Glasspool  /  Harri Heliövaara defeated  Sander Arends /  David Pel, 7–5, 7–6(7–4)

Singles main-draw entrants

Seeds 

 Rankings are as of March 1, 2021.

Other entrants 
The following players received wildcards into the main draw:
  Benjamin Bonzi 
  Hugo Gaston 
  Petros Tsitsipas

The following player received entry using a protected ranking into the main draw:
  Mackenzie McDonald

The following players received entry from the qualifying draw:
  Matthew Ebden 
  Constant Lestienne 
  Alex Molčan 
  Arthur Rinderknech

Withdrawals
  Aljaž Bedene → replaced by  Mackenzie McDonald
  Matteo Berrettini → replaced by  Mikhail Kukushkin
  Marin Čilić → replaced by  Cameron Norrie
  Kyle Edmund → replaced by  Egor Gerasimov
  Gilles Simon → replaced by  Lucas Pouille
  Jan-Lennard Struff → replaced by  Emil Ruusuvuori
  Fernando Verdasco → replaced by  Pierre-Hugues Herbert
  Jiří Veselý → replaced by  Grégoire Barrère

Retirements
  Matthew Ebden

Doubles main-draw entrants

Seeds 

 1 Rankings are as of 1 March 2021.

Other entrants 
The following pairs received wildcards into the doubles main draw:
  Albano Olivetti /  Jo-Wilfried Tsonga 
  Petros Tsitsipas /  Stefanos Tsitsipas

Withdrawals 
Before the tournament
  Sander Gillé /  Joran Vliegen → replaced by  Purav Raja /  Tristan-Samuel Weissborn
  Roman Jebavý /  Jiří Veselý → replaced by  Benjamin Bonzi /  Antoine Hoang
  Matthew Ebden /  John-Patrick Smith → replaced by  Matthew Ebden /  Matt Reid

References

External links 
Official website

Open 13
Open 13
Open 13
Open 13